New World is the fourth album by the singer/songwriter Karla Bonoff and her first in six years.

In 1989, Linda Ronstadt included three of Bonoff's compositions on her Cry Like a Rainstorm, Howl Like the Wind album. One, "All My Life," won a Grammy for Best Pop Performance by a Duo or Group with Vocal. In 1993, Wynonna Judd had a country music hit with Bonoff's "Tell Me Why," on which Bonoff played guitar and sang backing vocals.

Reception
AllMusic's William Ruhlmann noted retrospectively that with this album Bonoff "once again demonstrated her talent for plaintive romantic ballads." MusicHound Rock: The Essential Album Guide wrote that the album "contains Bonoff's best batch of songs since her debut." The Washington Post wrote that Bonoff "still creates sweet, simple melodies, and sings them with purity and sincerity, but they are sabotaged by vaporous lyrics that don't develop much beyond repeating titles like 'Tell Me Why' and 'Still Be Getting Over You.'"

Track listing
All songs written by Karla Bonoff, except where noted.

Personnel
Karla Bonoff – lead vocals, background vocals, keyboards, acoustic guitar
Mark Goldenberg – keyboards, electric guitar, acoustic guitar, bass guitar, programming
Peter Frampton – electric guitar, acoustic guitar 
Jennifer Condos – bass guitar
Debra Dobkin – percussion
Kenny Edwards – background vocals
Karen Blake – background vocals

References

1988 albums
Karla Bonoff albums